Juan Gabriel Rivas (born 14 August 1992) is an Argentine professional footballer.

Rivas played for teams like Chile's Unión Española or Ecuadorian side América de Quito.

References
 BDFA Profile 
 
 

1992 births
Living people
Argentine footballers
Argentine expatriate footballers
Unión de Santa Fe footballers
Deportivo Merlo footballers
Unión Española footballers
Chilean Primera División players
Argentine expatriate sportspeople in Chile
Expatriate footballers in Chile
Footballers from Santa Fe, Argentina
Association football midfielders